The Hubsugui mine is a large mine located in Mongolia. Hubsugui represents one of the largest phosphates reserve in Mongolia having estimated reserves of 632.9 million tonnes of ore grading 40% P2O5.

References 

Phosphate mines in Mongolia